St Saviour Church in Richmond Hill, Leeds, West Yorkshire, England is an active Anglican parish church in the archdeaconry of Leeds and the Diocese of Leeds.

History
The church was built between 1842 and 1845 to designs by architect John Macduff Derick. The church was anonymously funded by Edward Bouverie Pusey, Regius Professor of Hebrew at Oxford, a leading advocate of the Oxford Movement.  A tall spire, modelled on the spire of St Mary's, Oxford and pinnacles along the eaves were not built. The building was Grade I listed on 26 September 1963.

Present day
The parish stands in the Anglo-Catholic tradition of the Church of England.

Architectural style
The church is built in a Gothic revival style of dressed stone with ashlar dressings.  It has a central tower.  The church has four five-light windows described by Pevsner as being 'of great merit, in the style of the 13th century and in glowing colour, nothing yet of Victorian insipidity'.

Gallery

See also
List of places of worship in the City of Leeds
Grade I listed buildings in West Yorkshire
Grade I listed churches in West Yorkshire
Listed buildings in Leeds (Burmantofts and Richmond Hill Ward)

References

External links

A Church Near You - St Saviour

Anglican Diocese of Leeds
Church of England church buildings in West Yorkshire
Grade I listed churches in Leeds
Richmond Hill
Anglo-Catholic churches in England receiving AEO
Gothic Revival architecture in Leeds